The MNL Myanmar 2014 is the Myanmar National League's fifth full regular season. The first round of the season is scheduled to begin on 1 February 2014 and end on 8 June 2013. The second round begins on 7 June 2014 and ends on 21 November 2014.

Foreign players
The number of foreign players is restricted to four per MNL team, including a slot for a player from AFC countries.

Standings

Personnel and stadiums

Matches

Fixtures and results of the Myanmar National League 2014 season.

Week 1

Week 2

Week 3

Week 4

Week 5

Week 6

Week 7

Week 8

Week 9

Week 10

Week 11

Week 12

Week 13

Week 14

Week 15

Week 16

Week 17

Week 18

Week 19

Week 20

Week 21

Week 22

Season statistics

Top scorers

Hat-tricks

 4 Player scored 4 goals

Awards

Monthly awards

References

External links
 Season on themff.com

Myanmar National League seasons
1
Myanmar
Myanmar